Weed Money is the fifteenth solo studio album by American rapper Daz Dillinger. It was released on April 22, 2014 via D.P.G. Recordz/Felder Entertainment Inc. Production was mainly handled by Trippy Keez, as well as Dâm-Funk and Drumma Boy, with Daz Dillinger serving as executive producer. It features guest appearances from Snoop Dogg, Alexxus, Bo$$, Devin the Dude, Kurupt, Mitchy Slick, MJG, Mr. Short Khop, Murphy Lee, Slimm Calhoun, Soopafly, Trae tha Truth, Turk, Young Buck and Z-Ro.

Singles
On February 14, 2014, the album's first single "What's Your Pleasure" featuring Snoop Dogg was released. On March 27, 2014, the album's second single "The Reason Why" featuring Short Khop, Young Buck, Bo$$ and Murphy Lee was released.

Track listing

References

External links

2014 albums
Daz Dillinger albums
D.P.G. Recordz albums
Albums produced by Drumma Boy
Cannabis music